Mister Fantastic (Reed Richards) is a superhero character appearing in American comic books published by Marvel Comics. The character is a founding member, and the leader, of the Fantastic Four. Richards has a mastery of mechanical, aerospace and electrical engineering, chemistry, all levels of physics, and human and alien biology. BusinessWeek listed Mister Fantastic as one of the top ten most intelligent fictional characters in American comics. He is the inventor of the spacecraft that was bombarded by cosmic radiation on its maiden voyage, granting the Fantastic Four their powers. Richards gained the ability to stretch his body into any shape he desires.

Mister Fantastic acts as the leader and father figure of the Fantastic Four, and although his cosmic ray powers are primarily stretching abilities, his presence on the team is defined by his scientific acumen, as he is officially acknowledged as the smartest man in the Marvel Universe. This is particularly a point of tragedy in regards to his best friend, Ben Grimm, who he has constantly tried to turn back into his human form but who typically remains a large, rocky creature called the Thing. He is the husband of Susan Storm, father of Franklin Richards and Valeria Richards, and mentor of his brother-in-law, Johnny Storm.

The character was portrayed by actors Alex Hyde-White in the 1994 The Fantastic Four film, Ioan Gruffudd in the 2005 film Fantastic Four and its 2007 sequel Fantastic Four: Rise of the Silver Surfer, Miles Teller in the 2015 film Fantastic Four and John Krasinski in the 2022 Marvel Cinematic Universe film Doctor Strange in the Multiverse of Madness.

Publication history

Created by writer Stan Lee and artist/co-plotter Jack Kirby, the character first appeared in The Fantastic Four #1 (Nov. 1961). He was one of the four main characters in the title. Lee has stated the stretch powers were inspired by DC's Plastic Man, which had no equivalent in Marvel.

Reed Richards has continued to appear regularly in the Fantastic Four comic for most of its publication run.

Fictional character biography

Pre-Fantastic Four
Born in Central City, California, Reed Richards is the son of Evelyn and Nathaniel Richards. Nathaniel was a scientific genius, and Reed inherited a similar level of intellect and interests. A child prodigy with special aptitude in mathematics, physics, and mechanics, Reed Richards was taking college-level courses when he was 14. He attended such prestigious universities as the Massachusetts Institute of Technology, California Institute of Technology, Harvard University, Columbia University, and the fictional Empire State University. By the age of 20, he had several degrees in the sciences under his belt.

It was at Empire State University that he met Benjamin J. Grimm. Reed had already begun designing a starship capable of traveling in hyperspace. Sharing his plans with his new roommate, Grimm jokingly volunteered to pilot the craft.

Also while at State U he met a brilliant fellow student, Victor Von Doom. In Richards, Doom met the first person who could match him intellectually; regarding Richards as his ultimate rival, Doom became increasingly jealous of Richards. Determined to prove he was better, Doom conducted reckless experiments which eventually scarred his face and would lead him to become Doctor Doom.

During the summer months, Reed rented a room in a boarding house owned by the aunt of a young woman named Susan Storm, who was an undergraduate student at the time. Reed fell in love with Sue instantly and began courting her. Ultimately, Reed was too distracted from his work on his dissertation due to his romance with Sue and decided that the best thing for the both of them was to move out of Marygay's home.

Moving on to Harvard, Reed earned Ph.D.s in Physics and Electrical Engineering while working as a military scientist, all this by the age of 22. He also worked in communications for the Army. Three years later, in his mid-20s, Reed used his inheritance, along with government funding, to finance his research. Determined to go to Mars and beyond, Richards based the fateful project in Central City. Susan Storm moved into the area, and within a short time, found herself engaged to Reed. Reed's old college roommate, Ben Grimm, now a successful test pilot and astronaut, was indeed slated to pilot the craft.

All seemed well; however, when the government threatened to cut funding and cancel the project, Reed, Ben, Sue, and Sue's younger brother Johnny, agreed to sneak aboard the starship and take it up immediately. They knew they had not completed all the testing that had been planned, but Reed was confident they would be safe. Ben was initially skeptical about the unknown effects of radiation, while Reed theorized that their ship's shielding would be adequate to protect them.

It was on Reed's initiative that the fateful mission which had Susan Storm, Johnny Storm and Ben Grimm accompanying him into space took place. When their ship passed through the Van Allen belt they found their cockpit bombarded with nearly lethal doses of cosmic radiation. Reed had neglected to account for the abnormal radiation levels in the belt's atmosphere. The cosmic rays wreaked havoc on the starship's insufficient shielding and they were forced to return to Earth immediately. When they crash-landed they found that their bodies were changed dramatically. Reed's body was elastic and he could reshape any portion of his body at will. At his suggestion, they decided to use their new abilities to serve mankind as the Fantastic Four. Reed was chosen to lead the group, under the name "Mr. Fantastic". He later told his daughter, by way of a bedtime story, that the reason he suggested they become adventurers and gave them such outlandish costumes and names as "Mister Fantastic" and "The Thing" was that he knew they would likely be hated and feared for their powers without such an over-the-top public image.

This history has been changed over the years to keep it current. In the original comics, Richards was a veteran of World War II who had served behind enemy lines in occupied France, and the goal of his space mission was a crewed space flight to the moon before the Communists were able to. This was later changed to getting there before the Chinese Communists and to explore the interstellar areas of the red planet and beyond. Also, Reed originally states that he and Sue "were kids together" and that Sue was the "girl next door" who Reed left behind to go fight in the war. This origin story was, many years later, altered so that Sue was thirteen years old when she first met Reed, who was in his early twenties, at her Aunt Marygay's boardinghouse. Current official Marvel canon has since altered this origin story by combining elements of both—it eliminated the large age gap but maintained that Reed and Sue did not meet until their late teens at Aunt Marygay's boardinghouse. The change in age was an editorial decision made in 2013 as Reed developing, several years later, a romantic interest in a girl he first met when she was thirteen years old was deemed inappropriate.

Leadership of the Fantastic Four
The early career of the Fantastic Four led Mister Fantastic to a number of discoveries, and had their first encounters with many unusual characters. In the team's first appearance, they battled the Mole Man. They then battled the Skrulls. Soon after that, the team encountered the Sub-Mariner. They then had the first of many battles with Doctor Doom. They later journeyed to a subatomic world. Soon after that, they encountered Rama-Tut. They then battled the Molecule Man.

As the team leader, Mr. Fantastic created numerous exotic devices and vehicles for the team to use such as clothing made of 'unstable molecules' so that it can be used with their powers safely. Furthermore, he often leads the team into daring expeditions such as into the Negative Zone in addition to opposing evil. Also, he has felt personally responsible for Ben Grimm's grotesque change and has labored off and on to reverse it permanently.

Under his guidance, the team went on to become Earth's most celebrated band of heroes. Together, they would save the world countless times. Ever driven by his quest for knowledge, Reed is believed by most to be the Earth's foremost intelligence. There is little he cannot create, fix, or understand given time. The patents and royalties on his inventions alone have funded the group over the years.

However, there are drawbacks to his association with the team. Chief among them is the team's violent encounters with Doctor Doom, who believes that Reed was responsible for the accident that scarred him. Doom has never forgiven Reed and has sworn revenge. Doom has even gone as far as transforming Reed into a monstrous freak, attacking Reed's children and attempting to seduce Sue.

Subplots and story arcs
After many adventures as the Fantastic Four, Reed married Sue. Not long after that, the team encountered the Inhumans for the first time. They next encountered Galactus and the Silver Surfer. Reed then opened a portal to the Negative Zone for the first time. Soon, the team first battled the Psycho-Man. Before long Reed and Sue had a baby, Franklin; the team battled Annihilus right before Franklin's birth. Franklin was a mutant with incredible powers, but, due to the cosmic ray alteration to his parents' DNA, they manifested while he was still very young (in the Marvel world, most mutants like the X-Men get their powers while teenagers). Franklin appears to have power that can rival a member of the Celestials; the power of a god in the body of a small child. The couple briefly separated, and Reed further alienated Sue by shutting down Franklin's mind to prevent his power from causing global catastrophe; Sue Storm initiated divorce proceedings but the two were reconciled soon after.

Reed also saved Galactus's life during the course of his adventures. He then bought the Baxter Building. Later, he was tried by the Shi'ar for saving Galactus's life, but the charges were dropped when Eternity briefly granted all those attending the trial a moment of 'cosmic awareness' that allowed them to understand that Galactus was necessary for the continued well-being of the universe. Reed's battle with Gormuu prior to getting his powers was recounted. Just after that, Reed was reunited with his father in an alternate timeline. Some time later, Reed and Sue retired from the Fantastic Four, and then joined the Avengers, although Reed's past experience as leader of the Fantastic Four meant that he had trouble adjusting to following Captain America's lead regardless of his respect for the other man. Eventually, Reed and Sue did rejoin the Fantastic Four.

In the course of fighting an alien called Hunger, Doctor Doom was seriously injured. The Fantastic Four were also part of the battle against Hunger and Doom asked for his old enemy to take his hand. At that point they both disappeared in a flash, leaving nothing but ashes. It would appear as if the two sworn enemies had fittingly died in each other's hands.

However, unknown to anyone else at the time, Reed and Doom had actually been thrown back into the time of barbarians and onto an alien world by a being called Hyperstorm, Reed's grandchild from an alternate future, the child of Franklin Richards and Rachel Summers, daughter of Scott Summers and Jean Grey. They were so far into the past, and with no technology, that even their brilliant minds couldn't find a way back home. Doom was captured and held prisoner by Hyperstorm. Reed wandered aimlessly for about a year.

Meanwhile, the rest of the FF recruited Scott Lang as scientific advisor. They even confronted an insane alternative version of Reed called the Dark Raider who was traveling from reality to reality, destroying all the various versions of himself after his own failure to save his world from Galactus in their original confrontation.

A while later, the remaining members of the FF along with the Sub-Mariner, Lyja and Kristoff Vernard found themselves trapped in the same era as their Reed and Doom. They found Reed but faced a new problem: during his time alone, Reed had resigned himself to the reality that it was impossible for his old friends to stage a rescue and attacked them but soon realized that these truly were his friends. After returning to their own time period, he sought Galactus, as he was the only being in the Universe who could defeat Hyperstorm. Upon Hyperstorm's defeat at the hands of Galactus, the FF returned to the present day where they continued their lives, not only as a team, but as a family.

Onslaught and Heroes Reborn

Shortly after their return, the FF were confronted by a being called Onslaught. Onslaught took control of an army of Sentinels and invaded New York City, hunting down every mutant being he could find. Onslaught wished to add the abilities of the godlike Franklin Richards to his own. Only through the apparent sacrifice of the Fantastic Four's own lives and that of many of the heroes in the Marvel universe was Onslaught finally vanquished. The heroes would have died then and there if not for Franklin, who created an alternate reality for them to reside in. Completely oblivious to what had taken place, Reed and his compatriots relived most of their lives. In their absence the Fantastic Four's headquarters, Four Freedoms Plaza, was annihilated by a super villain group called the Masters of Evil, posing as heroes, The Thunderbolts. One year later, Franklin returned with his family along with the other heroes from the parallel reality. Reed was overjoyed to see his son again, but he and the rest of the FF found themselves without a home, moving into Reed's storage warehouse on Pier 4, overlooking the East River. Making this their home, the Fantastic Four continued with their lives, eventually managing to move back into the Baxter Building.

It has emerged that Reed is one of the members of the "Illuminati", unknown to his wife. He is also in possession of the "Power" gem of the Infinity Gauntlet.

Pro-Registration

In Marvel's Civil War miniseries and crossover event, Reed Richards is one of the leading figures, along with Iron Man, on the side which is in favor of the Superhuman Registration Act. He speculates that this will lead to conflict with his wife, which came true in issue #4 of the miniseries when a clone of Thor, created by him and Tony Stark, went out of control and killed Goliath and nearly killed all the rest of the Secret Avengers until Sue Storm stepped in and saved them. Soon after, Sue left Reed, along with Johnny, to join the Secret Avengers in hopes that it would drive Reed to end the conflict quickly.

In The Amazing Spider-Man #535, which takes place shortly before the events of Civil War #5, Peter Parker demands to see the conditions inside the detention facility designed by Reed to hold unregistered superhumans. After being escorted to and from the prison by Iron Man, Parker returns with more doubts than ever about whether he is on the right side and asks Reed why he supports the Superhuman Registration Act, a question Reed answers by telling the story of his paternal uncle, Ted. A professional writer, Reed remembers his uncle as "funny", "colorful", and "accepting". As a boy, Reed loved spending time with Ted. Unfortunately, Ted was also "an eccentric" and "stubborn". Because he had a career in the arts and because he stood out, Ted was called before HUAC, imprisoned on contempt of Congress charges for six months, and was unable to find work after he'd served his sentence. He was even shunned by Reed's father. Ted lost everything, which Reed says finally "killed him" without going into greater detail. Richards opines that his uncle was wrong to take such a stand, to pick a fight he couldn't win, and to fail to respect the law.

However Fantastic Four #542 reveals that the real reason for supporting the registration act is due to his development of a working version of Isaac Asimov's fictional psychohistory concept. His application of this science indicates to him that billions will die in escalating conflicts without the presence of the act. In the final battle of the war, he is shot by Taskmaster, saving Sue Storm's life. With Reed on the brink of death, a furious Sue crushes Taskmaster with a telekinetic field. Reed survives, however, and Sue returns to him in the aftermath of the battle, having been granted amnesty. Seeking to repair the damage done to their marriage as a result of the war, Sue and Reed take time off from the Fantastic Four, but ask Storm and the Black Panther to take their places in the meantime.

World War Hulk
Within the midst of Civil War, Reed Richards learned from a brief conversation with Mastermind Excello that the Hulk is not on the planet where the Illuminati attempted to exile him. After a conversation over the good the Hulk has done for humanity, Reed tells Iron Man of what happened to the Hulk and also states that the Hulk has friends, and "may God help us if they find him before we do".

Within the aftermath of Civil War, Reed Richards had been keeping tabs on Mastermind Excello and when the She-Hulk learned about the Hulk's exile, Reed Richards sends out Doc Samson to confront her when he sees her meeting with Mastermind Excello.

In World War Hulk #1, Reed is shown with Tony Stark as Iron Man. Both men were trying to convince Sentry to fight the Hulk, thinking that the calm aura that the Sentry produces may be able to stop the Hulk's rampage. In World War Hulk #2, with the aid of the rest of the Fantastic Four, Storm, and the Black Panther, Reed is able to create a machine that projects an image of the Sentry and recreates the hero's aura of calm. He uses the machine on the Hulk just as he is about to defeat the Thing, but the Hulk knows it is not the real Sentry and destroys the machine. In a last line of defense, Sue Storm tries to protect her husband by encapsulating the Hulk in an energy field while pleading with him to spare Reed. The Hulk does not listen and is able to easily exert enough strength against her force field to cause Susan to collapse and experience a nosebleed from the stress, before she dooms Reed to the Hulk's wrath.

Reed is later seen among the various heroes that the Hulk defeated so far, within the depths of the Hulk's Gladiator arena located within Madison Square Garden. He and all of the heroes are implanted with "obedience disks" that are used to suppress their powers. These disks are the same that were used upon the Hulk during his time on Sakaar. The Hulk orders Iron Man and Mr. Fantastic to face off in battle. Richards, after having the upper hand on Stark, is then given the thumbs down by Hulk, instructing Richards to kill Stark. However the Hulk spares their lives, showing them that he proved his point to the world. They survived the encounter by Hulk's mercy and the timely intervention of the Sentry. The Illuminati are partially cleared from the responsibility of Sakaar's destruction when Miek, one of the Hulk's alien allies, admits he saw the Red King forces breach the ship's warp core. Miek kept quiet to initiate what he felt was Hulk's destiny as the "Worldbreaker".

Secret Invasion

Mister Fantastic is at the Illuminati's meeting discussing the threat of the Skrulls when the Black Bolt with them is revealed to be a Skrull in disguise.

Mister Fantastic and Hank Pym autopsy the body of the Skrull who impersonated Elektra (with Reed pretending to be seeing the corpse for the first time, thus keeping the secret of the Illuminati). After completing the dissection, Reed claims to have discovered the secret of how the Skrulls have been able to conceal their identities. Before he can elaborate, "Hank Pym" reveals himself to be a Skrull and shoots Richards with a weapon that violently leaves his elastic body in a state of chaotic disarray similar to Silly String. In Secret Invasion: Fantastic Four #1, it is shown that a Skrull assumed Reed's form to successfully ambush and capture Sue Richards, to facilitate an attack on the Fantastic Four's headquarters.

A conscious but still mostly shapeless Reed Richards is seen being forcibly stretched in all directions to cover the floor of a medium-sized arena aboard a Skrull ship, with all of the seats filled by Skrull onlookers. He is freed by Abigail Brand, and then travels with her to the Savage Land and uses a device to reveal all the Skrull invaders present. After helping the Avengers to defeat the imposters and return to New York, Reed aids the heroes and villains of Earth in their battle against the Skrulls.

Dark Reign
Mister Fantastic aids the New Avengers in the search for the daughter of Luke Cage and Jessica Jones. He and the rest of the Fantastic Four are magically reduced to television signals by the chaotic activities of the Elder God Chthon, to prevent them from intervening, though after Chthon is defeated, he and the other three are turned back.

Norman Osborn has sent H.A.M.M.E.R. agents to shut down the Fantastic Four and capture them, expelling them from the Initiative and stripping them all their rights. Taking place a week from the Secret Invasion, which has caused Richards to seriously reevaluate his own life and the life he has built for his family, resulting in turbulent internal conflicts. Richards, as he takes a long, hard look at the life, is prompted to construct a machine that is capable of bending reality itself, to do so. Agents from H.A.M.M.E.R. (sent by Norman Osborn, a man well aware Reed is one of the few that have intellect exceeding even his own and thus pose a great threat to his carefully constructed shadow world) arrive just as Reed activates the machine, interfacing with the Baxter Building's power supply, resulting in an energy fluctuation that sends Sue, Ben and Johnny back to the prehistoric era, fraught with dangers, which manifest in the form of the First Celestial Host. Reed searches for answers which can only be found in alternate timelines as the three find themselves in a super hero Hyborian-age civil war; Franklin and Valeria are the only ones available to confront the agents Osborn sent. Richards studies other parallel Earths to see if any found a peaceful solution to the Civil War, which resulted from the Superhuman Registration Act. Reed peers into different worlds, some more bizarre than our own, to see what they did differently. This is an insightful look into where the Marvel Universe has gone in the past "year" (in Marvel time) and to see who was at fault, if anyone. Reed meets with the other five Illuminati to handle the problem. Ultimately, after seeing about a million alternate Earths, he had concluded that there was no way for the Civil War to be resolved but that he, as the cleverest man in the Marvel Universe, had a responsibility to put things right. But before turning the machine off, he searches for other realities where they have the same machines he is using; the machine locates them and the people he finds tell him that they can help him.

Reed Richards reappeared in The Mighty Avengers #24 refusing to give Hank Pym an invention previously left in the care of the Fantastic Four, following Bill Foster's untimely death, causing the Wasp to lead the team of Mighty Avengers to retrieve the device. In the next issue, Pym's attempting to knock down the Baxter Building (due to Loki's manipulations, likely) sows further displeasure and leads to a direct conflict between the Fantastic Four and Loki's Mighty Avengers, stretching across to The Mighty Avengers #26. This conflict eventually ends in a new base for the Mighty Avengers and a shockingly disturbing alliance of the Dark Reign; the next issue of the Mighty Avengers will show a new character, a ruler known as the Unspoken, one more powerful than any other in the universe, to the point he had to be erased from history, and how his return will impact the planet and the cosmos beyond, in the War of Kings.

After the Secret Invasion and some time into the Dark Reign, in the War of Kings, when Blastaar is about to open the portal to Earth, on the other side in Camp Hammond, Star-Lord and the Guardians tell Reed Richards and others to never open the portal, or they will face the wrath of Blastaar. Mister Fantastic agrees and says they will not open the portal and then asks who they are. Star-Lord replies, "We're the Guardians of the Galaxy" before leaving.

Future Foundation
Tragedy strikes the team when Johnny is apparently killed in the Negative Zone. As the Fantastic Four recover from Johnny's apparent death, Mister Fantastic grows disillusioned at how scientists see science and its applications. Therefore, he creates a new team, the Future Foundation, to help create a better future for mankind. However, the team's initial tasks are complicated when they are forced to deal with the 'Council of Reeds', a group of alternate versions of Reed Richards who lack his morality or family that became trapped in the FF's reality after an accident with Reed's dimensional portal.

The Quiet Man
After Johnny is returned and the team resume using the Fantastic Four name, they are systematically attacked by the mysterious Quiet Man, a figure who reveals that he has been behind many of the villain attacks the FF have faced over the years, now stepping forward to take a more active role as he shuts down Johnny's powers, frames the Thing for murder, has Reed and Sue Richards declared unfit guardians for their children, and then abducts Reed with the intention of framing him for a series of attacks committed by the heroes created in Franklin's pocket universe. However, Reed is able to defeat the Quiet Man's plan to proclaim himself the hero who defeated Reed's 'attack' on the world when he realizes that the Psycho-Man - one of the Quiet Man's allies - intended to betray him, forcing Reed and the Quiet Man to work together to deactivate the Psycho-Man's equipment.

Secret Wars
During the Secret Wars storyline, Reed is one of the few survivors of Earth-616 to come through with his memories intact, hiding in a 'life raft' with various other heroes and eventually released by Doctor Strange. Learning that the new 'Battleworld' is now ruled by Doctor Doom, who has absorbed the power of various Beyonders and Molecule Men to become a virtual god, Reed and the other heroes disperse across Battleworld to come up with a plan. 
Reed eventually starts working with his counterpart from the Ultimate Marvel universe who calls himself Maker. The two find themselves disagreeing on their methods, with Reed preferring to find a way to save the world while Maker is more focused on killing their enemy, Reed countering his other self's accusations that he is weak by musing that he simply has things to care for outside of himself. In the final confrontation, Reed and the Maker discover that the source of Doom's power is the Molecule Man (Owen Reece), but although the Maker attempts to betray Reed by forcibly devolving him into an ape, Reece reverses the Maker's attack and turns him into pepperoni pizza. When Doom comes down to confront Reed, Reed challenges Doom as Reece temporarily deprives Doom of his new god-level powers, Reed proclaiming Doom to be nothing more than a coward for taking control of what was left of existence rather than trying to reshape it. Inspired by Reed's words, Reece transfers Doom's power to him, with Reed recreating the former Earth-616 before he, Susan, their children, and the rest of the Future Foundation move to use Franklin and Reed's powers to rebuild the multiverse.

Return to Prime Earth
Mister Fantastic, Invisible Woman, and the Future Foundation were later confronted by the Griever at the End of All Things after Reed had expended most of his Beyonder-based energies while Franklin was left with only limited reality-warping abilities. Due to the Griever causing the collapse of 100 worlds, the Future Foundation had to make a stand even after Molecule Man was killed. When Mister Fantastic tricked the Griever into bringing their Fantastic Four teammates to them, Thing and Human Torch were reunited as every other superhero that was part of the Fantastic Four showed up as well. Faced with these numbers, the Griever was eventually driven back when most of her equipment was destroyed, forcing her to return to her universe or be trapped in this one, while the heroes were able to repair the damaged equipment to create a new teleporter to send them all home.

Powers and abilities
Reed Richards gained the power of elasticity from irradiation by cosmic rays. He has the ability to convert his entire body into a highly malleable state at will, allowing him to stretch, deform, and reform himself into virtually any shape. Richards has been observed as being able to utilize his stretching form in a variety of offensive and defensive manners, such as compressing himself into a ball and ricocheting into enemies, flattening himself into a trampoline or a parachute to catch a falling teammate, or inflating himself into a life raft to aid in a water rescue. He can willfully reduce his body's cohesion until he reaches a fluid state, which can flow through minute openings or into tiny pipes. Reed is also able to shape his hands into hammer and mace style weapons, and concentrate his mass into his fists to increase their density and effectiveness as weapons.

Having an elastic-like texture allows Reed protection from damage. He can be punched with incredible force, flattened, squished, and still re-form or survive without any form of sufficient injury.

Reed's control over his shape has been developed to such a point that he has been able to radically alter his facial features and his entire physical form to pass among human and non-humans unnoticed and unrecognized. He has even molded himself into the shapes of inanimate objects, such as a mailbox. He rarely uses his powers in such an undignified fashion. However, he appears to have no qualms about stretching out his ears, taking the shape of a dinosaur, becoming a human trampoline, or inflating his hands into pool toys to entertain his children.

The most extreme demonstration of Reed's powers is when at one point he was able to increase his size and mass to Thing-like proportions which also increased his physical strength.

Assuming and maintaining these shapes used to require extreme effort. Due to years of mental and physical training, Reed can now perform these feats at will. His powers (and those of the Red Ghost) were also increased when they were exposed to a second dose of cosmic rays. Maintaining his body's normal human shape requires a certain degree of ongoing concentration. When Reed is relaxed and distracted, his body appears to "melt in slow motion" according to Susan Storm. Being forcefully stretched to extremes during a short span of time (by a taffy-puller-type machine or a strong character, for example) causes Reed to suffer intense pain and the temporary loss of his natural elastic resiliency. He possesses other weaknesses too; a great shock to his body - for example, from the likes of Doctor Doom when he constructs around him - can make his body so rubbery he loses motor control. Enough energy can reduce him to a liquid state in which he is immobile.

Mister Fantastic's strength comes more from the powers of his mind than the powers of his body; indeed, he once told Spider-Man that he considers his stretching powers to be expendable compared to his intellect. Some stories have implied that his intellect may have been boosted by his powers, as he once visited an alternate universe where his other self-had never been exposed to cosmic rays and was notably less intelligent than him, though purely human versions of Reed that are as or even more intelligent than himself have been shown, particularly among the Council of Reeds. Tony Stark has commented that Reed's ability to make his brain physically larger (via his elastic powers) gives him an advantage, though this seems to be meant more as a joke. That said, scenes from the same issue show Reed "inflating" his skull as he calculates the power output of Tony's Repulsor-battery heart implant.

For virtually his entire publication history, Mister Fantastic has been depicted as one of the most intelligent characters in the Marvel Universe. A visionary theoretician and an inspired machine smith, he has made breakthroughs in such varied fields as space travel, time travel, extra-dimensional travel, biochemistry, robotics, computers, synthetic polymers, communications, mutations, transportation, holography, energy generation, and spectral analysis, among others. However, he is never afraid to admit when others have greater expertise in certain fields than him, such as recognizing that Doctor Octopus possesses greater knowledge of radiation, that Hank Pym is a superior biochemist, or that Spider-Man can think of a problem from a biology perspective where he would be unable to do so, since his expertise is in physics. Richards has earned Ph.D.s in Mathematics, Physics, and Engineering. His patents are so valuable that he is able to bankroll the Fantastic Four, Inc., without any undue financial stress. Mind control is rarely effective on him and when it does work, it wears off sooner than it would on a normal person, due to what he describes as an "elastic consciousness". However, this intelligence can be a handicap in his dealings with magic, as it required an intense lesson from Doctor Strange and facing the threat of his son being trapped in Hell for Reed to fully acknowledge that the key to using magic was to accept that he would never understand it.

Richards is also an accomplished fighter due to his years of combat experience with the Fantastic Four, and has earned a black belt in judo.

Following the Battleworld crisis, Reed has acquired the powers of the Beyonders that were once wielded by Doom, but he relies on his son Franklin's creativity and new powers to help him recreate the multiverse after the incursions destroyed the other parallel universes.

Equipment and technology
Although the Fantastic Four have numerous devices, crafts, and weapons, there are some items that Reed Richards carries with him at all times.

Fantastiflare: Launches a fiery "4" into the sky that is used during combat situations to let other members of the group know their location.

Uniform Computer: Like all the Fantastic Four's costumes and the rest of Reed's wardrobe, his suit is made of "unstable molecules". This means that the suit is attuned to his powers, which is why Johnny's costume doesn't burn when he "flames on", Sue's costume turns invisible when she does, and Reed's costume stretches with him. The costume also insulates them from electrical assaults. In addition, the team's uniforms are also, in essence, wearable computers. Their costumes have a complete data processing and telemetry system woven into the material of the uniform on a molecular level. This forms a network with the entire team, providing a constant, real-time uplink of everyone's physical condition as well as their location and current situation. The suit is capable of displaying data and touch-pad controls on the gauntlets. Its sensors can track all of the team's uniforms and provide a picture of their immediate vicinity. The suit has an intricate scanner system which can detect things around the wearer, from how many people are in the next room to what dimension or planet they are on. Reed can also up-link the bodysuit to any computer by stretching his fingertips to filament size and plugging them into an I/O data-port. With this, Reed can establish a fairly comprehensive database of any computer's cybernetic protocols and encryption algorithms.

Reception
 In 2022, Screen Rant included Mister Fantastic in their "MCU: 10 Most Desired Fan Favorite Debuts Expected In The Multiverse Saga" list.

Other versions

Age of Apocalypse
In the alternate reality known as the Age of Apocalypse, Richards never received superpowers as he was never bombarded with cosmic radiation in space. Instead, he attempted to evacuate a large group of humans from Manhattan during Apocalypse's regime. Along with Ben Grimm as the pilot and his friends Johnny and Susan Storm as crew, Richards used one of his prototype rockets to fly off the island. Unfortunately, a mutant sabotaged the launch and both Reed and Johnny sacrificed themselves to let the others blast off safely.

Following the rise of Weapon Omega, it is revealed that when Apocalypse came into power, Reed became the world's foremost authority on the Celestials and had collected all the information he could gather about these cosmic beings in several journals. Apocalypse himself was known to fear Reed Richards' knowledge and had him targeted and created a special taskforce to locate the journals but while they succeeded in killing him, they weren't able to find the journals which eventually came to Victor von Doom's possession.

Amalgam Comics
Amalgam Comics is a 1997-98 shared imprint of DC Comics and Marvel, which features composites of characters from the two publishers.  Two alternate versions of Reed Richards appear in this series.
The one shot issue Challengers of the Fantastic #1 features Reed "Prof" Richards (a composite of Marvel's Reed Richards and DC Comics Prof Haley), a nonsuperpowered scientist and leader of the eponymous team of adventurers.
In Spider-Boy Team-Up #1, Elastic Lad makes a cameo appearance as a member of the Legion of Galactic Guardians 2099 (a composite of DC's Legion of Super-Heroes and Marvel's Guardians of the Galaxy and "2099" imprint). Elastic Lad is a composite of Richards and Jimmy Olsen's Elastic Lad character.

Bullet Points
In Bullet Points, Dr. Reed Richards is drafted by the government to act as technical support to Steve Rogers, who in this reality is Iron Man. Along with Sue, Ben and Johnny, he later attempts the rocket flight that in the mainstream continuity saw the creation of the Fantastic Four, but the flight is sabotaged and the rocket crashes, killing everyone aboard except Reed. He thus never develops superpowers, and following the tragedy, he accepts the position as Director of S.H.I.E.L.D. Having lost his eye in the rocket crash, Reed wears an eyepatch, giving him a strong resemblance to Nick Fury.

Council of Reeds
The Interdimensional Council of Reeds first appeared in Fantastic Four #570 (Oct. 2009). The council is composed of multiple versions of Reed Richards from alternate universes, each with different powers, intellects, and abilities. Reeds join the council when they are able to invent a device (called "the Bridge") that allows them to cross into the nothingness between realities. The leaders of the council are the three Reeds that have acquired their reality's Infinity Gauntlet. The 616 Reed discovers that the other Reeds have one thing in common: each of them grew up without their father Nathaniel Richards, whose influence made the 616 Reed a more compassionate man.  Reed declines membership to the council after realizing he would have to sacrifice his family ties to join. Nearly all the Council members are killed when the mad Celestials of Universe-4280 gain entry to the Council headquarters and attack the Reeds.

Due to an accident caused by Valeria Richards, four Reeds gain access to the Earth-616 reality. 616-Reed is forced to assemble a team of his old enemies - including Doctor Doom, the Wizard, and the Mad Thinker - to try to outthink his alternate selves before they destroy their world.

Counter Earth

The Counter-Earth version of Reed Richards is from a world created by the High Evolutionary; Counter-Earth originally existed within the reality of Earth-616 and is thus, technically, not an alternate Earth. His exposure to cosmic rays gives him the ability to transform into a savage purple-skinned behemoth called the Brute. The Brute makes his way to Earth, where he traps Mister Fantastic in the Negative Zone and replaces him. He manages to trap the Human Torch and the Thing shortly thereafter but is found out by the Invisible Woman, who rescues her teammates and leaves the Brute trapped in their place. The Brute is later a member of the Frightful Four Brute joined the Frightful Four and assisted them in fighting the Fantastic Four. He first appeared in Marvel Premiere #2 (May 1972).

Dark Raider
An alternate Reed Richards from Earth-944, he first appeared in Fantastic Four #387 (April 1994). He is driven mad when he fails to save his reality's Earth from Galactus. Taking the identity of the Dark Raider, he travels from reality to reality on a quest to destroy every possible version of himself. The Fantastic Four first encounter him when they traveled to an alternate past and see younger versions of themselves die at his hands. When the Dark Raider comes to the Fantastic Four's reality, he attempts to activate the Ultimate Nullifier but is apparently destroyed by Uatu. This appearance of Uatu is later revealed to be Aron, the Rogue Watcher, who had simply teleported the Raider away. The Dark Raider returns, and is finally killed by the Invisible Woman in the Negative Zone.

Earth-A
In this reality, only Reed and Ben Grimm go up in the experimental spacecraft. Reed is transformed by cosmic radiation into The Thing, while Ben gains the stretching powers of Mr. Fantastic and the flaming powers of the Human Torch.

Exiles
An Earth dominated by hedonistic Skrulls since the late nineteenth century is attacked by Galactus. This Reed Richards is portrayed as an inventive genius with nothing to confirm that he possesses the powers of his 616 counterpart. He leads the super-human effort to drive off Galactus and save the planet. He becomes one of the caretakers of Thunderbird, a dimension-hopping hero who had been severely injured in the battle.

Heroes Reborn (2021)
In the 2021 "Heroes Reborn" reality, Reed Richards is a scientist at S.H.I.E.L.D. Labs. He alerts Hyperion that the inmates of the Negative Zone have escaped.

Marvel 1602
Set in the 17th century Marvel 1602 universe, Reed (apparently called Sir Richard Reed, although he is often addressed as "Sir Reed" or "Master Richards") is the leader of 'The Four from the Fantastick', and his pliability is compared to water. Sharing the genius of his counterpart, he has devised uses for electrical force, categorized the sciences, and speculated as to whether light has a speed.

According to Peter David, who is writing a Marvel 1602 miniseries about the Four, Gaiman describes Sir Richard as even more pedantic than the mainstream Mr. Fantastic. During a trip to Atlantis, Richard Reed had trouble accepting the idea that the Atlanteans had a connection to Poseidon or their brief encounter with the Watcher, until Susan helped him realise that just because such things could not be understood by their present standards did not mean that humanity could not come to understand them later.

Marvel Apes
The Reed of this reality is an intelligent ape given stretching powers by exposure to cosmic radiation, as in the mainstream Marvel universe. He tries to find a way to send Marty "The Gibbon" Blank back to his home reality. He is also one of the few that realizes Captain America is really a disguised Baron Blood. Reed is impaled and killed by Blood in an attempt to stop the vampire from trying to invade Earth-616 for a new source of blood. The rest of the Marvel Ape-verse heroes are led to believe Marty is responsible for Reed's death and pursue him until discovering the truth.

Marvel Mangaverse
In the Marvel Mangaverse comics, Reed Richards leads the Megascale Metatalent Response Team Fantastic Four as a commander, not a field operative like Jonatha, Sioux, and Benjamin. In Mangaverse, Richards has been re-imagined as a long-haired intellectual with a laid-back attitude. The other members of the team often describe him as a "smartass". His team used power packs to manifest their talents on mecha-sized levels so that they may fight the Godzilla-sized monsters from alien cultures that attack Earth for performing experiments which endanger all of reality. Along with assigning battle tactics, Richards okayed the amount of power his team was allowed to use. He has stretching talents which he considered "near useless" except for stretching his neurons, allowing him to brainstorm new ideas. In the New Mangaverse, Richards (along with the rest of the Fantastic Four with the exception of the Human Torch) was murdered by ninja assassins.

Marvel Zombies
This version of Reed Richards deliberately infects his team and himself with the zombie virus after suffering a mental breakdown due to the murder of his children at the hands of a zombified She-Hulk. Regarding the zombies as a superior form of life, Reed sets out "to spread the Gospel", a twisted plan to start turning the survivors of the Marvel Universe into zombies. Reed later assists his fellow zombies in tracking down several Latverian human survivors; they escape to alternate dimensions but Doctor Doom does not. Using a dimensional crossing device created by Tony before his infection, Reed makes contact with his Ultimate counterpart. The Zombie FF attempts to escape into the Ultimate Marvel universe, but the zombie Reed is neutralized when the Ultimate Invisible Girl destroys a chunk of his brain, allowing the Ultimate team to contain their counterparts. When the Zombie FF try to escape after a brief period of imprisonment, Ultimate Reed Richards (in Doctor Doom's body) destroys them by covering him with maggots, and their corpses returned to their universe. It is suggested in Marvel Zombies: Evil Evolution that Richards was inadvertently responsible for allowing the zombie virus to infect this reality through the construction of a device allowing access to alternate dimensions, namely he was responsible for bringing in the zombie Sentry, the only zombie left.

MC2
In the MC2 continuity, Reed Richards designs a small robot into which he claims to have transferred his brain after his body was scarred in an accident; in reality, Richards' injuries are minor, and he controls the robot remotely from an outpost in the Negative Zone. This robot, called Big Brain, is a member of the Fantastic Five, and is capable of projecting force fields and can hover or fly. When Reed solves the problem keeping Susan in stasis in the Negative Zone, the mental block preventing his scars from healing dissolves, and his appearance returns to normal.

In an alternate universe in the MC2 line, the Red Skull conquered the world and killed Captain America.  The Skull is later killed by Doctor Doom, for whom Reed serves as an advisor. After Doom and Crimson Curse fall into a portal, Richards turns on fellow advisor Helmut Zemo. Later Reed becomes a mad scientist, aided by evil versions of Ben Grimm, Franklin Richards and Peter Parker. They are defeated by Spider Girl, Thunderstrike and Stinger.

When Dr. Doom returns, Reed is forced into a mental duel with the villain, which ends in a tie that banishes both their minds to the "Crossroads of Infinity". He is currently in Latveria, under the care of his wife.

Mutant X
In the alternate universe visited by Alex Summers, a.k.a. Havok, the Fantastic Four have no powers, though Reed still has his genius-level intelligence. Reed generally wears a battle suit with two extra arms. In his first appearance, he is attempting to build a machine that will allow the Goblin Queen to summon demons from another dimension. In the final issue of the series, Reed joins a makeshift team of villains and heroes to stop the Goblin Queen's threat against the entire multiverse. He is interrupted in his work by Dracula, who slices open his throat, killing him.

Spider-Gwen
In the universe featuring Gwen Stacy as Spider-Woman, Reed is an African-American child genius that shares his inventions with other kids around his age. He is asked for help by Jessica Drew from the 616 universe to try to get her home, and reveals that he has encountered other Dimensional hoppers before her. He aids the Spider-Women by altering their weaponry for their final battle against his earth's Cindy Moon and later serves as an ally to Spider-Gwen.

Spider-Man: Life Story
Spider-Man: Life Story features an alternate continuity where the characters naturally age after Peter Parker becomes Spider-Man in 1962. In the 1970s, Peter Parker and Otto Octavius began working for Reed at Future Foundations. He and Peter got into several arguments over the Vietnam War and how superheroes should serve humanity, eventually leading Peter to quit. In the 1980s, Peter and Reed made amends while participating in the Secret Wars, though Peter laments that Richards is a ghost of his past self, having pushed away all his friends and loved ones out of a misplaced sense of responsibility for Doctor Doom. In this continuity, Sue left Reed to be with Namor.

Spider-Man Unlimited

In the comic book based on the Spider-Man Unlimited animated series, Peter is assigned by the Daily Byte to investigate the Counter-Earth version of Reed Richards, as Richards is suspected of knowing about a mysterious creature called the Brute.  After fighting the Brute as Spider-Man, it is revealed that the Brute is actually Reed Richards himself, who is helping the rebels fight the Beastials, while Reed is actually a spy. He is also assisted in this mission by his friend, Ben Grimm, who gathers data held by the High Evolutionary. Reed reveals that after a test flight similar to the one that gave the mainstream Fantastic Four their powers, the cosmic rays transformed Reed into the Brute, leaving Grimm unaffected, Johnny Storm dead, and Susan Storm in a coma.

Ultimate Marvel

Maker, previously known as Ultimate Reed Richards is the Ultimate Marvel's version of Mister Fantastic. The origin of Ultimate Reed's powers is different than the original Reed. Ultimate Reed Richards gets engulfed in a malfunctioned teleporter experiment to get the superpower to stretch.  He founds the Ultimate Fantastic Four that explores the N-Zone and fight various villains. After the Fantastic Four disbands due to the damage caused by "Ultimatum", Reed begins to change his worldview and eventually calls himself Maker and becomes a nemesis to the Ultimates. When Galactus arrives in the Ultimate universe due to a temporal distortion, the Ultimates are forced to approach the Maker for help. Maker travels to Earth-616 to access his counterpart's files. Using the information gained, Reed defeats Galactus by sending him to the Negative Zone.

After the events of Secret Wars, Maker moves to the main Marvel universe, also known as Earth-616, where he continues his nefarious plans.

What If? 

Marvel's What If? comic book series featured several alternate versions of Reed Richards and the Fantastic Four.

Spider-Man in the FF
On the world designated Earth-772, in What If?, Spider-Man joined the Fantastic Four, but his presence resulted in Sue feeling increasingly sidelined in favour of the four male members of the team, resulting in her leaving the team to marry the Sub-Mariner. Although Reed was briefly driven insane and declared war on Atlantis, he eventually recovered and the two apparently reconciled, resulting in the 'Fantastic Five' reforming once again in time to confront Annihilus in the Negative Zone to help Susan give birth.

Vol. I #6
In What If? #6 (Dec. 1977), after the team are exposed to cosmic rays, they develop powers based on their personalities. Reed Richards' vast intellect causes him to become a giant floating brain, and he takes to calling himself "Big Brain". Reed's brain is destroyed during a battle with Doctor Doom, but not before he manages to transfer his mind into Doom's body. This version of the Fantastic Four reappeared in the Volume II story arc 'Timestorm', summoned by the Watcher to persuade the man who would become Kang/Immortus not to become a threat. Richards' and the other members of his Fantastic Four are killed by Immortus.

Vol. I #11
In What If? #11 (May 1978), an alternate universe is shown wherein the original 1960's staff of Marvel Comics are exposed to cosmic rays. Stan Lee gains the powers of Mister Fantastic, and is described as slowly gaining Reed's scientific intellect as well. Lee continues to write and edit Marvel Comics by day, but fight evil along with his fellow members of the Fantastic Four.  The story was written by Lee, and drawn and co-written by Jack Kirby, who in this reality became the Thing.

Vol. II #11
In What If? vol. 2 #11 (March 1990), the origins of the Fantastic Four are retold, showing how the heroes lives would have changed if all four had gained the same powers as the individual members of the original Fantastic Four.

Fire Powers: In this alternate history, the cosmic rays give the four the powers of the Human Torch. They decide to use their powers for good, and become the Fantastic Four. They battle such menaces as the Mole Man and the alien race Skrulls. During a battle with the mystic Miracle Man, the villain brings to life a statue advertising a monster movie called "The Monster from Mars." When the heroes set fire to the statue, the fire spreads to a local apartment building, killing young Angelica Parsons. Feeling responsible for Parsons's death, the team disbands, with Reed devoting his life to science.
Elastic powers: In this alternate history, Reed, Sue, Johnny, and Ben develop the ability to stretch. Deciding not to become superheroes, Ben and Sue discover their love for one another and settle down to raise a family, never using their stretching powers again. Reed devotes his life to science, while Johnny becomes the celebrity Mister Fantastic.
Monstrous forms: The cosmic rays in this alternate history transform the four into monstrous creatures, with Reed taking on a purple-skinned form similar to the Brute. When the public reacts with fright at their appearances, Reed convinces the others to leave civilization and live on Monster Isle.
Invisibility powers: In the final What If? story, Ben Grimm, Reed Richards, Johnny Storm, and Sue Storm gain different aspects of the mainstream Sue Storm's power. Reed can project invisibility onto other objects.  Reed and his three associates join Colonel Nick Fury's new C.I.A. unit, codenamed S.H.I.E.L.D., where he worked as Head of Laboratories.  The story retells their initial encounter with Doctor Doom under these circumstances.

In other media

Television 
 Mister Fantastic appears in Fantastic Four (1967), voiced by Gerald Mohr.
 Mister Fantastic appears in The New Fantastic Four, voiced by Mike Road.
 Mister Fantastic appears in Fantastic Four (1994), voiced by Beau Weaver. He and Sue Storm are already married before they get their powers.
 Mister Fantistic appears in The Incredible Hulk episode "Fantastic Fortitude", voiced again by Beau Weaver. He and the other Fantastic Four take their vacation prior to Hulk, She-Hulk, and Thing fighting Leader's Gamma Soldiers.
 Mister Fantastic appears in Spider-Man, voiced by Cam Clarke. He and the Fantastic Four are among the heroes Spider-Man summons to a planet to help him against the villains the Beyonder brought there. Mister Fantastic helps to awaken the dormant part of Curt Connors' mind in the Lizard.
 Mister Fantastic appears in Fantastic Four: World's Greatest Heroes, voiced by Hiro Kanagawa.
 Mister Fantastic appears in The Super Hero Squad Show, voiced by James Marsters.
 Mister Fantastic appears in The Avengers: Earth's Mightiest Heroes, voiced by Dee Bradley Baker. He made a brief cameo appearance in the episode "The Man Who Stole Tomorrow". He reappears in the episode "The Private War of Doctor Doom" where the Avengers and the Fantastic Four team up to battle Doctor Doom and his Doombots.
 Mister Fantastic appears in the Hulk and the Agents of S.M.A.S.H. episode "Monsters No More", voiced by Robin Atkin Downes. He teamed up with the Agents of S.M.A.S.H. to stop the Tribbitite invasion.

Film
 Mister Fantastic appears in the unreleased 1994 film The Fantastic Four, portrayed by Alex Hyde-White.
 Mister Fantastic appears in Fantastic Four and its sequel Fantastic Four: Rise of the Silver Surfer, portrayed by Ioan Gruffudd. In the film continuity, Reed Richards is initially a brilliant yet timid and pedantic scientist who, despite his genius-level understanding of the sciences and being (as he is described in the second film) "one of the greatest minds of the 21st century", is fiscally incompetent and nearing bankruptcy, forcing him to seek investment from Victor von Doom (in the film continuity a rival scientist and successful businessman) to further his projects.
By the events of Fantastic Four: Rise of the Silver Surfer, Reed, along with his teammates, is an internationally recognized superhero and celebrity. His celebrity status often goes to his head. Reed and Sue are now engaged, although Reed has trouble keeping himself from being distracted from his imminent wedding due to various crises around the world (which is established as the fifth attempt they have made).
 Mister Fantastic makes a non-speaking cameo appearance in Planet Hulk. His face was shadowed because the rights to the character were held by 20th Century Fox. He and the members of the Illuminati regretfully inform Hulk of the decisions made to ensure his removal from Earth.
 Mister Fantastic appears in the 2015 Fantastic Four film, portrayed by Miles Teller. At a young age, Reed Richards and Ben Grimm work on a project teleporting device which catches the attention of the Baxter Foundation's director Franklin Storm. Reed helps to create the Quantum Gate which takes him, Ben, Johnny Storm and Victor von Doom to Planet Zero. The effects of Planet Zero gives Reed the ability to stretch. Blaming himself for the incident while being held at a government facility, Reed escapes and remains incognito. After being found by the military one year later, Reed is taken to Area 57 where he is persuaded to help repair the Quantum Gate. Things get worse when Victor resurfaces and plans to use Planet Zero to reshape Earth. After he, Ben, Johnny and Susan defeat Victor, they remain together as Reed comes up with their group name.
 An alternate universe version of Reed Richards appears in the Marvel Cinematic Universe film Doctor Strange in the Multiverse of Madness, portrayed by John Krasinski. This version is a member of the Illuminati from Earth-838. In this universe, he is also a founder of the Fantastic Four, and a member of the Baxter Foundation, where a variant of Christine Palmer works to analyze potential threats from the multiverse. When Scarlet Witch possesses her Earth-838 counterpart and attacks the Illuminati, Reed tries to reason with her, but after confirming that he has children whose mother is alive, she tears him apart and destroys his brain after musing that there will still be someone left alive to look after his children.

Video games
 Mister Fantastic is a playable character in the 1997 Fantastic Four PlayStation game.
 Mister Fantastic has a cameo appearance in the Spider-Man game based on his 1990s animated series for Sega Genesis and Super NES. By reaching certain levels of the game, Mr. Fantastic can be called a limited number of times for assistance.
 Mister Fantastic appears as a playable character in Marvel: Ultimate Alliance voiced by David Naughton. He has special dialogue with Bruce Banner, Uatu, Black Bolt, Karnak, Crystal, Arcade, and Colonel Fury. A simulation disk has Mister Fantastic fight Bulldozer in Murderworld. Another simulation disk has Thing protect Mister Fantastic, when he's frozen by Rhino. His classic, New Marvel, original and Ultimate costumes are available.
 Mister Fantastic appears in the Fantastic Four video game based on the 2005 film voiced by Ioan Gruffudd with his classic appearance voiced by Robin Atkin Downes in bonus levels.
 Mister Fantastic appears in the Fantastic Four: Rise of the Silver Surfer video game based on the film voiced by Matthew Kaminsky.
 Mister Fantastic appears in Marvel: Ultimate Alliance 2 voiced by Robert Clotworthy. His classic design is his default costume and his Ultimate design is his alternate costume. Since the game is based on Civil War, he is locked onto the Pro-Registration side along with Iron Man and Songbird.
 Mister Fantastic is a playable character in Marvel Super Hero Squad Online.
 Reed Richards is one of the four scientists Spider-Man tries to call in the 2008 video game Spider-Man: Web of Shadows, along with Tony Stark, Hank McCoy and Hank Pym. The answering machine states that the Fantastic Four are out of the galaxy.
 Mister Fantastic makes a cameo in Ultimate Marvel vs. Capcom 3 in Frank West's ending. In the ending, he tells Frank about the Marvel Zombies, and that as soon as they are done consuming their own world, they will be coming to theirs. Not wanting that to happen, Frank and Mr. Fantastic team up to stop them.
 Mister Fantastic appeared in the virtual pinball game Fantastic Four for Pinball FX 2 voiced by Travis Willingham.
 Mister Fantastic is a playable character in the Facebook game Marvel: Avengers Alliance.
 Mister Fantastic appears in Marvel Heroes as an NPC and as a playable character, voiced by Wally Wingert. However, due to legal reasons, he was removed from the game on July 1, 2017.
 Mister Fantastic appears as a playable character in Lego Marvel Super Heroes, voiced by Dee Bradley Baker. While working on the mysteries of the Cosmic Bricks, Mister Fantastic and Captain America end up fighting Doctor Octopus until they are assisted by Spider-Man.
 Mister Fantastic is a playable character in the mobile game Marvel: Future Fight.
 Mister Fantastic is a playable character in the mobile game Marvel Puzzle Quest.
 Mister Fantastic appears in the "Shadow of Doom" DLC of Marvel Ultimate Alliance 3: The Black Order, voiced again by Wally Wingert. This version resembles his current bearded appearance.

In popular culture

 A parody of Mr. Fantastic is shown on the Adult Swim cartoon, The Venture Bros. The show features a character named Professor Richard Impossible (voiced by Stephen Colbert in seasons 1, 2, and "All This and Gargantua-2," Peter McCulloch in "The Terrible Secret of Turtle Bay," Christopher McCulloch in season 3, Bill Hader in season 4), who attains the same powers as Mr. Fantastic.
 In a season 4 episode of Stargate Atlantis, "Travelers" Lt Col John Sheppard uses the alias Reed Richards when kidnapped.
 In The Simpsons "Treehouse of Horror" episode segment titled " Stop the World, I Want to Goof Off!", there is a moment where the family is transformed to resemble members of the Fantastic Four; Bart is Mr. Fantastic. He exhibits the same ability as Stretch Dude in a previous "Treehouse of Horror" episode entitled "Desperately Xeeking Xena".
 Mister Fantastic appears in the Robot Chicken episode "Monstourage" voiced by Seth Green.
 Norm Macdonald plays Reed Richards in a skit appearing in his comedy album Ridiculous. In it, the members of the Fantastic Four are deciding on their names; after Reed comes up with "The Thing", "The Invisible Woman," and "The Human Torch" for his teammates, he decides to call himself "Mr. Fantastic". His teammates become upset, because unlike the other names, "Mr. Fantastic" does not really describe his powers.
 Mister Fantastic's genitalia, along with that of fellow Fantastic Four member The Thing, is discussed in the film Mallrats in a scene guest-starring Stan Lee.

Reception
Mister Fantastic was ranked as the 41st Greatest Comic Book Character of All Time by Wizard magazine IGN ranked Reed Richards as the 40th Greatest Comic Book Hero of All Time stating that "Mister Fantastic numbers among the very smartest men in the Marvel Universe" and that "Sure, his obsession with science sometimes comes at the detriment of his family life, but a kinder and nobler hero you'll rarely find." Mr. Fantastic was also listed as #50 on IGN's list of the "Top 50 Avengers".

References

Sources
MDP: Mister Fantastic - Marvel Database Project
Official Marvel Picture site
Official Fantastic Four movie webpage
Official Fantastic Four: Rise of the Silver Surfer movie webpage

External links
Mister Fantastic Bio at Marvel.com
Ultimate Mister Fantastic on the Marvel Universe Character Bio Wiki
Marc Singer on Reed Richards and the Galactus Saga.

Avengers (comics) characters
Characters created by Jack Kirby
Characters created by Stan Lee
Comics characters introduced in 1961
Fantastic Four characters
Fictional astronauts
Fictional California Institute of Technology people
Fictional characters from California
Fictional characters from Connecticut
Fictional characters from New York City
Fictional characters who can stretch themselves
Fictional characters with superhuman durability or invulnerability
Fictional Columbia University people
Fictional explorers
Fictional Harvard University people
Fictional inventors
Fictional Massachusetts Institute of Technology people
Fictional professors
Fictional schoolteachers
Fictional theoretical physicists
Male characters in film
Marvel Comics American superheroes
Marvel Comics characters who are shapeshifters
Marvel Comics film characters
Marvel Comics male superheroes
Marvel Comics mutates
Marvel Comics scientists